Alice: Interactive Museum is a 1991 click-and-go adventure game, developed by Toshiba-EMI Ltd and directed by Haruhiko Shono. It uses elements and ideas inspired by Lewis Carroll's Alice's Adventures in Wonderland, and uses pre-rendered 3D computer graphics (like 1993's Myst). It was designed for Windows 3.x and later released for the Windows 95 platform. They were followed by Shono's third title, Gadget: Invention, Travel, & Adventure, in 1993.

Plot
The player wanders through a mansion of twelve rooms including a gallery, an atelier, a wine cellar and a photo studio. Each room is interconnected via halls, doors, and secret passages - one of which leads to the outside world. The player must collect all of the cards missing from a 53-card set of playing cards and then decipher the associated clues that appear on the cards. Correctly solving the puzzle will lead to The Last Room and the end game. The artwork on the walls is very interactive resulting in clues or surprises.

Production
Alice was developed with MacroMind Director and  Ray Dream Designer. With music by Kazuhiko Katō, and artwork by Kuniyoshi Kaneko, the game has been noted as an ambitiously artistic piece of software.

Reception
Computer Gaming World in 1993 called Alice "like some kind of charmingly weird and elusive scavenger hunt where one is never really quite sure where they may be going or what they are looking for". The magazine praised the art as "a very elegant and richly rendered environment that makes it a browser's paradise", comparing it to the René Magritte's surrealism. It recommended Alice to those interested in a "surreal 'electronic toy'", not a CD-ROM game.

Shono was heralded as a pioneer by America's Newsweek and Japan's Ministry of International Trade and Industry. Following the sleeper success of Shono's third title Gadget: Invention, Travel, & Adventure (1993), Alice and L-Zone were re-released in America.

References

External links

1991 video games
Adventure games
Windows games
Video games based on Alice in Wonderland
Classic Mac OS games
Hidden object games
Video games developed in Japan
Single-player video games
Toshiba EMI games